Muntaner is a Catalan surname. Notable people with the surname include:

Antoni Roig Muntaner (1931–2019), Spanish politician
David Muntaner (born 1983), Spanish track cyclist
Ramon Muntaner (1265–1336), Catalan mercenary and writer

Catalan-language surnames